Pachydactylus waterbergensis is a species of lizard in the family Gekkonidae. It is endemic to Namibia.

References

Endemic fauna of Namibia
Pachydactylus
Reptiles of Namibia
Reptiles described in 2003